Pakan may refer to:

Places

Canada 
 Pakan, Alberta, a town
 Pakan (electoral district), defunct

Malaysia 
 Pakan, Sarawak, a town in Sarawak
 Pakan District, in Sarawak
 Pakan (state constituency)

Taiwan 
 Beigang River, formerly known as the Pakan
 Pakan, an historical name for the island of Taiwan; see History of Taiwan

Other uses 
 Pakan language